Sood is a village near Naharlagun in Papum Pare district of Arunachal Pradesh

References

Villages in Papum Pare district